The Assistant is a reality television show that parodied other reality shows such as The Apprentice, The Bachelor, The Bachelorette, Survivor, American Idol, and Fear Factor. Its eight episodes originally aired on MTV. It featured comedian Andy Dick's search for a new personal assistant. The beginning of the first episode parodied The Bachelor, with the twelve contestants arriving in limousines, and Dick waiting outside to greet them with his maid and butler. A "rose ceremony" immediately followed, and one contestant was eliminated.

Dick assigned the Hollywood hopefuls to some absurd tasks such as pretending to be him in an interview with a Japanese television station, bringing him coffee by traversing on a beam over a swimming pool, breaking up with his girlfriend, and attempting to get him a star on the Hollywood Walk of Fame.

Contestants were usually "clipped" in elimination ceremonies parodying those on other reality series. Like some other programs, The Assistant also included double elimination episodes and brought back fired candidates. Driving home Dick's message that they were starting from the bottom, candidates slept in Dick's garage. He also woke them with a flashing, siren-generating alarm, was prone to tantrums, and griped that, "This reality show is ruining my life!"

Andy Dick actually had a relationship with one of the contestants on the show. Andy and Sarah Beckworth dated for a while after the show's end. The end of the relationship led to a breach of contract lawsuit with MTV which prohibited relationships with the contestants.

Though the show was satire, the twelve contestants were real and the winner, Melissa Ordway, was awarded several prizes including a job at MTV. The runner-up was Mark, who had been fired, but was brought back in the seventh episode. The show was not renewed after its first season.

Contestants eliminated and reality show parodied
(in reverse order of elimination)
 Melissa Ordway (Winner)
 Mark Rogers
 The Apprentice theme, Eliminated Episode 4 (brought back Episode 7)
 Eliminated Episode 8
 Tanika Kennedy
 Fear Factor theme, Eliminated Episode 7
 Mykell Wilson
 American Idol theme, Eliminated Episode 6
 Colin Blake
 American Idol theme, Eliminated Episode 6
 Anna Enger
 Unaware, surprise lie detector test, Eliminated Episode 5
 Stefani Fischer
 The Amazing Race theme, Eliminated Episode 5
 Ebony Costain
 Survivor theme, Eliminated Episode 3
 Nikeda Stanback
 Who Wants to be a Millionaire theme, Eliminated Episode 1 (brought back Episode 3)
 Survivor theme, Eliminated Episode 3
 Sarah Beckworth
 America's Next Top Model theme, Eliminated Episode 2
 Jeff Jimenez
 America's Next Top Model theme, Eliminated Episode 2
 Andrew Sturgis (Andrew Rodgman)
 The Bachelor theme, Eliminated Episode 1

References

External links
 
 The Assistant on mtv.com
 All Episodes of The Assistant at Andy Dick's website
  on USA Today

2004 American television series debuts
2004 American television series endings
2000s American reality television series
MTV reality television series
Reality television series parodies